WDYZ (660 kHz) is a commercial AM radio station licensed to Altamonte Springs, Florida, and serving Greater Orlando. The station is owned by JVC Media and airs a sports radio format.  The studios and offices are in Maitland, Florida.

WDYZ's transmitter is off Charles Street in Longwood. The station uses a three-tower array. It transmits with 3,500 watts by day, but because AM 660 is a clear channel frequency reserved for WFAN in New York City, WDYZ must reduce power to 1,000 watts at night. The station uses a directional antenna at all times.

History
The station first signed on the air in 1986 as WGOR. Originally it broadcast on 650 kHz and was licensed to Christmas, Florida. WGOR was a 10,000-watt daytimer. It carried a Christian radio format.

In the 1990s, the station was acquired by Floyco, Inc. It changed its call sign to WORL to represent Orlando. It moved one spot up the dial to AM 660 and changed its city of license to Altamonte Springs. The move was designed to allow the station to broadcast around the clock, which was not possible when it was on AM 650, due to its proximity to WSM Nashville, the 50,000-watt clear channel station on 650 kHz.

In 2001, WORL was acquired by James Crystal, Inc., which also owned stations in the Miami and West Palm Beach radio markets. Crystal programmed a mix of talk, business news and religion. But the company ran into financial problems several years later. In 2006, Salem Media acquired the station, to air its own lineup of conservative talk programming.

In July 2019, it was announced that JVC Broadcasting, owners of country station WOTW, would acquire WORL and its FM translator for $900,000. Salem moved the conservative talk format to WTLN (950 AM) on August 19, 2019, and the station began stunting by redirecting listeners to 950 AM on a loop. As Salem retained rights to the WORL calls, the WDYZ calls from 990 AM were swapped to 660 AM. JVC announced that it planned to launch a new hot talk format on the station, Florida Man Radio, which officially launched on September 9, featuring hosts like Bubba the Love Sponge, Scott Ledger, and The Shannon Burke Show (which had been displaced by WYAY in Atlanta after its sale and conversion to K-Love).

In November 2019, JVC announced plans to syndicate the Florida Man Radio programming state-wide, adding Gainesville sister station WYGC to the network beginning November 11, 2019. The station also announced that Ed Tyll would join the network as midday host.

On February 8, 2023, WDYZ changed their format from hot talk to sports, branded as "ESPN 660", with programming from ESPN Radio around the clock.

References

External links

DYZ (AM)
Radio stations established in 1986
1986 establishments in Florida
Sports radio stations in the United States
ESPN Radio stations